Devianz is a French rock band founded in 2004.

History
 September 2004: creation of Devianz by Guyom Pavesi, Maxime Decitre and Benoît Blin.
 April 2005: the band enters the LB Lab studio with Stéphane Buriez (Loudblast).
 December 2005: release of the first album Una Duna In Mezzo All’Oceano.
 End of 2006: the Eleganz video clip is broadcast on some cable channels (Nolife...).
 2007: back to the studio for the recording of an EP Les Lèvres Assassines , recorded by Davy Portela (Pleymo).
 April 2009: first French tour with Aesthesia.
 July 2009/February 2010: recording of the second album.
 January 2010: announcement of the participation of Vincent Cavanagh from Anathema on vocals and arrangements on a track of the new album.
 April 2010: exclusive broadcasting on Ouï FM of a track from the forthcoming album.
 May 2012: release of the second album À Corps Interrompus.

Line-up

Current members 
Guyom Pavesi: vocals since 2004
Benoît Blin: guitars since 2004
Pierre Labarbe: guitars since 2006
Vincent Rémon: bass guitar since 2007

Past members 
 Maxime Decitre: drums from 2004 to 2008 and 2014
 Emmanuel Mechling: bass guitar from 2004 to 2006
 Nicolas Robache: bass guitar from 2006 to 2007
 Nicolas Pytel: drums from 2008 to 2011
 Charles-Vincent Lefèvre: drums from 2011 to 2012
 Thibault Faucher: drums from 2012 to 2014

Discography

Una Duna In Mezzo All'Oceano 
 Release date: November 21, 2005
 Track list:
Quatre Longs Matins
El Silencio Es Muerto
Innocente Petite Chose
Odalisque 1
Eleganz
Décembres Naïfs
Des Parallèles
Solstice Du Premier Âge
Odalisque 2
Тринадцать
Épistophane
Bitter Landscape/Simple De Jade
 Additional information: recorded and mixed by Stéphane Buriez (Loudblast) at the LB Lab studio, mastered byr Jean-Pierre Bouquet at the Autre Studio.

Les Lèvres Assassines 
 Release date: May 31, 2008
 Track list:
040506
Vos Enfants Sont Aussi Des Animaux
Innocente Petite Chose
Cœur D'Odalisque
Vivre Ou Survivre (Daniel Balavoine cover)/Backdoor Killer (hidden track)
+ videoclip Eleganz
 Additional information: recorded, mixed and mastered by Davy Portela (Pleymo) at the Midilive, Nowhere, Daniel and Sriracha studios. Videoclip directed by Jean-Philippe Astoux.

Trouble Amante 
 Release date: December 19, 2011
 Track list:
 Trouble Amante
 J'en Appelle Au Silence
 L'Alchimie Des Sens
 Shout (Tears For Fears cover) (downloadable bonus track)
 Additional information: Recorded and mixed by Guyom Pavesi, mastered by Alan Douches.

À Corps Interrompus 
 Release date: May 14, 2012
 Track list:
 Happiness In Frustration
 Des Racines Dans La Chair
 Soleil D'Encre
 Sous Une Lune De Plomb
 L'Instant Suspendu
 L'Alchimie Des Sens
 Mute Echo Room
 Douze De Mes Phalanges
 Ton Corps N'Est Qu'Atome (featuring Vincent Cavanagh from Anathema)
 Trouble Amante
 Lames De Sel
 Arpeggio
 Passion/Omission
 En Attendant L'Aube (bonus track on the physical edition)
 Additional information: Recorded and mixed by Guyom Pavesi, mastered by Alan Douches.

Media 

 The "Eleganz" videoclip has been broadcast on some cable channels (Nolife...).
 Devianz recorded the soundtrack of the short movie Le Gendre directed by Eric Sicot with the track Backdoor Killer.
 On April 29, 2009, Devianz has been mentioned as a musical reference by the deputy Patrick Roy for the music downloading debate at the Assemblée Nationale.
 Devianz recorded the soundtrack of the short movie - NYC- directed by Seb Houis with a cover of "Shout" by Tears For Fears.
 On April 11, 2010, the track "Soleil D'Encre" from the forthcoming second album is exclusively broadcast on Ouï FM.
 On June 24, 2012, the track "L'Alchimie Des Sens" appears on the new Broken Balls magazine compilation: Broken Balls Fanzine – Compil No. 6.

References

External links
Official Devianz facebook page

French alternative rock groups
French indie rock groups
Musical groups from Paris